Bodysong is the debut solo album by Radiohead guitarist Jonny Greenwood. It is the soundtrack to the documentary film of the same name. It was released on October 27, 2003 in the UK and on February 24, 2004 in the United States.

It was digitally remastered and reissued on CD and vinyl on 18 May 2018. Greenwood's brother, Radiohead bassist Colin, plays bass on the album. It is notable for be the first "solo" album released by any member of Radiohead. Currently, Colin Greenwood (Jonny's brother) is the only Radiohead member that has not yet released any solo material.

The piece "Convergence" was used in Greenwood's score for the 2007 film There Will Be Blood. The inclusion of the track along with excerpts of another Greenwood piece, "Popcorn Superhet Receiver", disqualified the score from the 2008 Academy Awards, as scores cannot contain pre-existing music.

Track listing 
 All songs written and produced by Jonny Greenwood:
 "Moon Trills" – 5:17
 "Moon Mall" – 1:12
 "Trench" – 2:38
 "Iron Swallow" – 2:07
 "Clockwork Tin Soldiers" – 3:48
 "Convergence" – 4:26
 "Nudnik Headache" – 2:16
 "Peartree" – 3:06
 "Splitter" – 3:57
 "Bode Radio/Glass Light/Broken Hearts" – 4:36
 "24 Hour Charleston" – 2:39
 "Milky Drops from Heaven" – 4:44
 "Tehellet" – 3:40

Personnel 
Adapted from the liner notes.

 Jonny Greenwood - piano, ondes Martenot, guitar, banjo, production

 Graeme Stuart - production, recording
 Shin Katan - artwork
 Stanley Donwood - artwork
 Julian Arguelles - saxophone (tracks 9,12)
 Gerard Presencer - trumpet (tracks 9, 12)
 Colin Greenwood - bass guitar, programming (track 11)
 Jeremy Brown - bass guitar (tracks 9, 12)
 Gene Calderazzo - drums (tracks 9, 12)
 The Emperor Quartet - strings (tracks 4, 10, 13)
Martin Burgess - violin
Violin: Clare Hayes
Viola: Fiona Bonds
Cello: William Schofeld

See also 
 Music from The Body

References

External links 
 

Jonny Greenwood albums
2003 soundtrack albums
Capitol Records soundtracks
EMI Records soundtracks
Parlophone soundtracks
Instrumental soundtracks
Documentary film soundtracks